Regional 2 Severn is a level six league in the English rugby union system, one of twelve leagues, at this level. The twelve teams are based in counties near the River Severn, i.e. Gloucestershire and Somerset, with two from Wiltshire. The clubs finishing in the first two places are automatically promoted to Regional 1 South West.

Format
The twelve teams in this league are drawn from across Gloucestershire (five teams), Somerset (five) and Wiltshire (two), with the league champions and runner-up promoted to Regional 1 South West. Relegation is to one of the level seven County 1 Leagues

The season runs from September to April and comprises twenty-two rounds of matches, with each club playing each of its rivals home and away. The results of the matches contribute points to the league table as follows:
    4 points are awarded for a win
    2 points are awarded for a draw
    0 points are awarded for a loss, however
    1 losing (bonus) point is awarded to a team that loses a match by 7 points or fewer
    1 additional (bonus) point is awarded to a team scoring 4 tries or more in a match

Current season

Participating teams and locations

References

External links
 Rugby union in the South West

6
Recurring sporting events established in 2022
 
 
 
Sports leagues established in 2022